The following is a timeline of the history of the city of Venice, Veneto, Italy.

Prior to 19th century

 421 CE - Church established on Rialto. First mention of Poveglia.
 452 - "Consular government adopted."
 697 - Paolo Lucio Anafesto becomes Doge of Venice.
 774 - Catholic diocese established on Olivolo, comprising Dorsoduro, Luprio, and Rialto.
 814 - Venetian seat of government relocated to Rialto per Treaty of Ratisbone.
 828 - Mark the Evangelist designated patron saint of city.
 836 - Doge's Chapel built.
 902 - St Mark's Campanile construction begins.
 1094 - St Mark's Basilica consecrated.
 1097 - Market established on Rialto.
 1131 - Church of San Clemente is the first established settlement on the Isola di San Clemente.
 1157 - Bank established.
 1173 - Rialto Bridge made of wood opened, designed by Nicolò Barattieri.
 1204 - Fourth Crusade embarks from Venice.
 1228 - Fondaco dei Tedeschi built.
 1264 - Bridge built across Grand Canal.
 1291 - Glassmakers relocate to Murano.
 1297 - Legislative body formally established.
 1333 - Botanical garden planted.
 1348 - Plague.
 1360 - Ponte della Paglia (bridge) built (approximate date).
 1386 - Jewish burial ground granted on the Lido.
 1394 - Public clock installed.
 1423
 Lazaretto (quarantine) established on the island of Lazzaretto Vecchio.
 Francesco Foscari becomes doge.
 1430 - Santi Giovanni e Paolo church rebuilt.
 1447 - Scuola degli Albanesi founded.
 1469 - Printing press in operation.
 1475 - De honesta voluptate et valetudine cookbook published.
 1495 - Printer Aldus Manutius in business.
 1500 - Jacopo de' Barbari's woodcut View of Venice is published
 1501 - Petrucci's Harmonice Musices Odhecaton (songbook) published.
 1507 - Cinque Savi alla Mercanzia (trade board) established.
 1514 - Fire on Rialto.
 1516 - Jewish ghetto in Cannaregio established.
 1520 - Palazzo dei Dieci Savi built.
 1527 - Jacopo Sansovino "appointed public architect."
 1541 - Sempiterni compagnie founded.
 1548 - Population: 158,069.
 1558 - Establishment of a permanent postal connection between Venice and Kraków, capital of the Kingdom of Poland.
 1565 - Theatre built.
 1569 - 13 September: Arsenal explodes.
 1575 - Fondaco dei Turchi established.
 1575-77 - Plague.
 1587 - Banco della Piazza di Rialto (bank) opens.
 1591 - Rialto Bridge built of stone.
 1600 - Bridge of Sighs built.
 1613 - Monteverdi becomes maestro di cappella of St Mark's Basilica.
 1630
 1629–31 Italian plague strikes Venice.
 Accademia degli Incogniti founded.
 1637 - Teatro San Cassiano (opera house) opens.
 1642 - Premiere of Monteverdi's opera L'incoronazione di Poppea.
 1645 - Coffee house in business.
 1649 - Premiere of Cavalli's opera Giasone.
 1678 - Italian Baroque composer Antonio Vivaldi is born on 4 March.
 1682 - Dogana built.
 1706 - Population: 140,256.
 1720 - Vezzi porcelain begins
 1720 - Caffè Florian in business.
 1741 - Il Nuovo Postiglione newspaper begins publication.
 1744 - Joseph Smith becomes British consul.
 1750 - Accademia di Belle Arti di Venezia founded.
 1755 - Teatro San Benedetto (theatre) opens.
 1761 - Gozzi's L'Osservatore Veneto begins publication.
 1764 - Cozzi porcelain begins
 1778 - Notizie del mondo newspaper begins publication.
 1785 - Population: 139,095.
 1792 - La Fenice opera house built.
 1797 - Republic of Venice ends; Austrians in power per Treaty of Campo Formio.

19th century

 1805 - French in power per Peace of Pressburg.
 1812 - Ateneo Veneto founded.
 1814
 Austrians in power again.
 Ala Napoleonica section of Piazza San Marco built.
 1815 - General Archive of Veneto established.
 1830
 City becomes a free port.
 Museo Correr (museum) established.
 1842 - Milan–Venice railway begins operating; Venezia Mestre railway station opens.
 1844
 Premiere of Verdi's opera Ernani.
 Mental asylum established on Isola di San Clemente.
 1848
 March: Republic of San Marco established.
 27 October: Battle of Mestre.
 1853 - Premiere of Verdi's opera La Traviata.
 1854 - Accademia bridge built.
 1857 - Population: 118,173.
 1859 - Venice becomes part of the Italian confederation of Austria, per Treaty of Villafranca.
 1861 - Venezia Santa Lucia railway station opens.
 1866 - Venice becomes part of the Kingdom of Italy per Treaty of Vienna (1866).
 1868 - Regia Scuola Superiore di Commercio (business school) established.
 1870 - Artificial creation of the island of Sacca Sessola completed.
 1871 - Population: 128,901.
 1876
 Liceo e Società Musicale Benedetto Marcello established.
 L'Adriatico newspaper begins publication.
 1880 - 16 June: John Cross, on honeymoon with English novelist George Eliot, jumps from their hotel room into the Grand Canal in an episode of mental disorder.
 1881 - Population: 132,826. 
 1883
 Lido and Malamocco annexed to city.
 13 February: German composer Richard Wagner dies at Ca' Vendramin Calergi of a heart attack, age 69.
 1887 - Il Gazzettino newspaper begins publication.
 1889 - 12 December: English poet Robert Browning dies at his son's home Ca' Rezzonico, age 77.
 1892 - Conversion of Sacca Sessola into a hospital for contagious diseases is begun.
 1895 - Venice Biennale begins.
 1897 - Population: 155,899.

20th century

 1906 - Population: 169,563.
 1907 - F.B.C. Unione Venezia (football club) formed.
 1910 - 27 April: Futurist poet Filippo Tommaso Marinetti issues the manifesto Contro Venezia passatista ("Against Past-loving Venice") in the Piazza San Marco.
 1913 - Stadio Pier Luigi Penzo (stadium) opens.
 1917 - Marghera becomes part of Venice.
 1922 - Mental asylum established on Poveglia.
 1923 - Pellestrina becomes part of Venice.
 1924 - Burano, Ca'Savio, and Murano become part of Venice.
 1926
 , Favaro, Mestre, and  become part of Venice.
 Nicelli Airport begins operating.
 1927 - A.C. Mestre football club formed.
 1929 - 19 August: Russian-born ballet impresario Sergei Diaghilev dies in Venice and is buried on the Isola di San Michele.
 1931 - Harry's Bar in business.
 1932 - Venice Film Festival begins.
 1933 - Ponte della Libertà (bridge) opens.
 1937 - Collegio Navale della Gioventù Italiana del Littorio (naval school) established.
 1940 - Università Iuav di Venezia (architecture institute) founded.
 1945 - Operation Bowler.
 1949 - Cinema Teatro Corso built in Mestre.
 1956 - Venice Conference.
 1958 - Hotel Cipriani in business.
 1966 - 4 November: 1966 Venice flood: highest acqua alta.
 1970 - Veneto regional administration implemented.
 1972 - 1 November: American poet Ezra Pound dies in the Civil Hospital and is buried on the Isola di San Michele.
 1978 - Società Filologica Veneta founded.
 1980 - June: 6th G7 summit held.
 1981 - Venice hosts the 1981 European Karate Championships.
 1987 - June: 13th G7 summit held.
 1993 - Massimo Cacciari becomes mayor.
 1996 - 29 January: La Fenice opera house is destroyed by fire.
 1999 - City master plan created.
 2000
 Paolo Costa becomes mayor.
 Sacca Sessola sold to a multi-national company for conversion into a private tourist hotel complex.

21st century

 2003 - Buildings on Isola di San Clemente refurbished as a luxury hotel complex.
 2005 - Massimo Cacciari becomes mayor again.
 2006 - Veritas (water/trash municipal entity) established.
 2008 - Fondazione Musei Civici di Venezia established.
 2010 - Giorgio Orsoni becomes mayor.
 2013 - Population: 259,263 comune; 865,421 province.
 2014
 June: Mayor Orsoni arrested.
 29 September: Clooney-Alamuddin wedding.
 2015 -  held; Luigi Brugnaro becomes mayor.
 2019 - 12 November: Second highest acqua alta hits an already flooded city.
 2020 - the city of Venice is hit hard by the COVID-19 pandemic, tourism is blocked and the Carnival of Venice is closed early.
 2021 - 1600th Anniversary of the Foundation of Venice.

See also
 History of the city of Venice (it)
 List of mayors of Venice, 1806–present
 Timeline of the Republic of Venice

Timelines of other cities in the macroregion of Northeast Italy:(it)
 Emilia-Romagna region: Timeline of Bologna; Ferrara; Forlì; Modena; Parma; Piacenza; Ravenna; Reggio Emilia; Rimini
 Friuli-Venezia Giulia region: Timeline of Trieste
 Trentino-South Tyrol region: Timeline of Trento
 Veneto region: Timeline of Padua; Treviso; Verona; Vicenza

References

This article incorporates information from the Italian Wikipedia and German Wikipedia.

Bibliography

External links
 Digital Public Library of America. Items related to Venice, various dates

.
.
Venice
T